Peter Wells may refer to:

 Peter Wells (cartoonist) (1912–1995), American cartoonist
 Peter Wells (athlete) (1929–2018), British Olympic high jumper 
 Peter Wells (medical physicist) (1936–2017), British medical physicist and researcher into ultrasound technology
 Peter Wells (politician) (1937–2005), Australian politician
 Peter Wells (guitarist) (1946–2006), Australian rock guitarist
 Peter Wells (writer) (1950–2019), New Zealand author and film director
 Peter Wells (footballer) (born 1956), English football goalkeeper with Nottingham Forest and Southampton
 Peter Bryan Wells (born 1963), American Catholic archbishop, Assessor of General Affairs in the Roman Curia
 Peter Wells (chess player) (born 1965), English chess grandmaster
 Peter Wells (sailor) (born 1974), American Olympic sailor 
 Peter Wells (rower) (born 1982), British Olympic rower
 Pete Wells, American food writer
 Peter Wells, member of the New Apocalyptics poetry group